Thomas Ridgeway Dey (born April 14, 1965) is an American film director, screenwriter, and producer. His credits include Shanghai Noon, Showtime, Failure to Launch, and Marmaduke.

Early life
Dey was born in Hanover, New Hampshire, the son of Phoebe Ann (née Evans) and Charles Frederick Dey, who was Associate Dean at Dartmouth College from 1963 to 1973 and headmaster of Choate Rosemary Hall. He is a graduate of The Choate School (now Choate Rosemary Hall) in Wallingford, Connecticut, Brown University, and the American Film Institute in Los Angeles. Dey got his start by shooting a spec commercial reel which landed him a spot at Ridley Scott Associates.

Filmography 
Film
 Shanghai Noon (2000)
 Showtime (2002)
 Failure to Launch (2006)
 Marmaduke (2010)
 Wedding Season (2022)

Television
 Snatch (2018) (3 episodes)

References

External links

1965 births
Film directors from New Hampshire
AFI Conservatory alumni
Brown University alumni
Choate Rosemary Hall alumni
Living people
People from Hanover, New Hampshire
People from Wallingford, Connecticut
Film directors from Connecticut